Caonillas Arriba is a barrio in the municipality of Villalba, Puerto Rico. Its population in 2010 was 1537.

History
Puerto Rico was ceded by Spain in the aftermath of the Spanish–American War under the terms of the Treaty of Paris of 1898 and became an unincorporated territory of the United States. In 1899, the United States Department of War conducted a census of Puerto Rico finding that the population of Caonillas Arriba barrio was 2,200.

Sectors
Barrios (which are roughly comparable to minor civil divisions) in turn are further subdivided into smaller local populated place areas/units called sectores (sectors in English). The types of sectores may vary, from normally sector to urbanización to reparto to barriada to residencial, among others.

The following sectors are in Caonillas Arriba barrio:

, and 
.

As of 2015, La Sierrita has not had regular water service for years. The Federal Emergency Management Agency earmarked money in 2020 to be used for permanent upgrades to water service systems for residents of La Sierrita, among others.

See also

 List of communities in Puerto Rico
 List of barrios and sectors of Villalba, Puerto Rico

References

Barrios of Villalba, Puerto Rico